Kvasten, "The Broom" is a steel inverted roller coaster at the Gröna Lund amusement park in Stockholm, Sweden. The ride is a Suspended Family Coaster built by Vekoma designed specifically for families.

References

Roller coasters in Sweden
Suspended Family Coaster roller coasters
Gröna Lund